is a Japanese contemporary artist.

Biography
Yosuke Amemiya graduated from Department of Oil Painting in Tama Art University.

Exhibitions
Yosuke Amemiya participated in solo and group exhibitions in Japan and around the world, including Netherlands Media Art Institute, The Living Art Museum, Ueno Royal Museum, Mori Art Museum, Bangkok Art and Culture Centre,

References

External links
 Yosuke Amemiya
 Perfectly Ordinary Stones, Carried For 1,300 Years
  interview Mori Art Museum - Video interview,2010
 Mori Art Museum Roppongi Crossing 2010

1975 births
Living people
Japanese contemporary artists
Tama Art University alumni